Tres citas con el destino ("Three Dates With Destiny") is a 1954 Mexican film directed by Fernando de Fuentes.

Cast
 Manuel Arbó		
 Ricardo Argemí...(as Argemí)
 Félix Briones
 José Castellón	
 Fernando Cortés		
 Juana Cáceres	
 Fernando Galiana
 Carmela de Gracia	
 Sara Guasch
 Santiago Gómez Cou		
 Narciso Ibáñez Menta		
 Maurice Jouvet		
 Jorge Mistral		
 Tito Novaro		
 Nathán Pinzón

External links
 

1950s Spanish-language films
Films directed by Fernando de Fuentes
Mexican black-and-white films
Mexican crime films
1954 crime films
1950s Mexican films